Elegant Stealth is the twenty-first studio album from rock band Wishbone Ash and the culmination of 2 years of writing and recording sessions. The songs featured on the band's 2012 tour of Europe.

The album features guest artists Don Airey (Deep Purple / Ozzy Osbourne / Black Sabbath) and Pat McManus (Mama's Boys / Celtus / Pat McManus Band).

All songs were recorded at Cross Stix Studios, Lancashire, UK on AMS Neve genesys by Tom Greenwood except for "Reason to Believe" and "Man with No Name" which were recorded by Stephan Ernst (also at Cross Stix). Both of these recordings were mixed at Separate Sounds Studios in Nuremberg, Germany.

Track listing
All songs composed by Andy Powell, Muddy Manninen, Bob Skeat and Joe Crabtree, except where noted

"Reason to Believe" – 4:21
"Warm Tears" – 5:02
"Man with No Name" – 4:18
"Can't Go It Alone" (Pat McManus) – 5:39
"Give It Up" (Powell) – 5:07
"Searching for Satellites" – 6:02
"Heavy Weather" – 6:40
"Mud-slick" (Manninen) – 4:14
"Big Issues" – 7:42
"Migrant Worker" – 5:13
"Invisible Thread" – 11:34

"Invisible Thread" includes a hidden track after approx. one minute of silence: "Reason to Believe – Remix by Al Carson"

Personnel

Wishbone Ash
Andy Powell –  guitar, lead vocals
Muddy Manninen –  guitar, vocals
Bob Skeat –  bass, vocals
Joe Crabtree –  drums & percussion

Additional musicians
Don Airey - Hammond B3 organ on "Mud-slick"
Pat McManus - fiddle on "Can't Go It Alone"

References 

2011 albums
Wishbone Ash albums
ZYX Music albums